Paul Ioan Pațurcă (born 20 March 1996) is a Romanian professional footballer who plays as a midfielder for Liga II Concordia Chiajna.

References

External links
 
 Paul Pațurcă at lpf.ro

1996 births
Living people
Footballers from Bucharest
Romanian footballers
Association football midfielders
Liga I players
Liga II players
FC Sportul Studențesc București players
LPS HD Clinceni players
AFC Turris-Oltul Turnu Măgurele players
FC Gloria Buzău players
CS Gaz Metan Mediaș players
CS Concordia Chiajna players